Maddah may refer to:

 Maddah, an Arabic diacritic
 Maddah (religious singer)

See also
Maddahi